Liran Strauber (or Shtrauber, ; born 20 August 1974) is a former Israeli association footballer who played as a goalkeeper. At international level, Strauber was capped at under-17 and under-21, and played eight times for the senior Israel national team.

Early and personal life
Strauber was born in moshav Yagel, Israel, to a family of Ashkenazi Jewish descent.

In 2006, he married former Likud parliament member of the Knesset, Inbal Gavrieli. The two divorced in 2009. In May 2011, he married Elinor Avigdol.

Sports career
Strauber began his career in the youth club of Hapoel Tel Aviv and was promoted to the senior squad in 1992.  Strauber remained in Hapoel Tel Aviv for one season before moving to Hapoel Kiryat Ono for one season too.  At the next season Strauber was playing in Bnei Yehuda Tel Aviv where he stayed for one year.  During playing in those three clubs Strauber was also the goalkeeper of the Israel national under-21 football team and had 17 international caps.

At the 1995/96 season Strauber was a player of Maccabi Ironi Ashdod before returning to Bnei Yehuda Tel Aviv for another season.  The next season, he moved to Hapoel Jerusalem and played there for two seasons.  After two seasons in Jerusalem Strauber moved to Maccabi Tel Aviv where he spent 7 seasons in his career and was one of the leading players in this club, winning the Israeli Championship once in 2002/03 and playing with the club in the UEFA Champions League and the UEFA Cup.  During the 2005–06 season Strauber had disputes with the fans and management of Maccabi Tel Aviv, resulting in his transfer to Maccabi Netanya before the 2006–07 season. The club reached second place that season and qualified for the UEFA Cup qualifying rounds, for the first time in its history. Strauber managed to have a clean sheet for 783 minutes (9 games) from 8 December 2007 to 16 February 2008, which is a record in the history of Israeli football.

After three seasons in Maccabi Netanya he made his return to Maccabi Tel Aviv. He was Maccabi Tel Aviv's team captain. After a poor form in the last season of Maccabi Tel Aviv He left the club as a free agent and signed for Maccabi Petah Tikva.

He retired from football after getting relegated with Maccabi Petah Tikva to Liga Leumit.

Strauber made 513 appearances in the Israeli Premier League which puts him in the 6th place of the league's all-time table.

Honours

Club
Bnei Yehuda
Toto Cup Top Division: : 1996–97

Maccabi Tel Aviv
Israeli Premier League: 2002–03
State Cup: 2001, 2002, 2005

Individual
Israeli Premier League Beast Goalkeeper of the Year: 2007–08

See also
Sports in Israel

References

External links
 

1974 births
Living people
Israeli Ashkenazi Jews
Israeli footballers
Jewish footballers
Hapoel Tel Aviv F.C. players
Hapoel Kiryat Ono F.C. players
Bnei Yehuda Tel Aviv F.C. players
Maccabi Ironi Ashdod F.C. players
Hapoel Jerusalem F.C. players
Maccabi Tel Aviv F.C. players
Maccabi Netanya F.C. players
Israel international footballers
Israel under-21 international footballers
Liga Leumit players
Israeli Premier League players
Israeli people of Romanian-Jewish descent
Big Brother (franchise) contestants
Association football goalkeepers